The Capture of HMS Savage was a naval battle of the American Revolutionary War involving the American privateer Congress and the British sloop-of-war HMS Savage. It occurred in September 1781 off South Carolina and is considered one of the hardest-fought single ship actions of the war.

Capture
By 1781 the smaller British vessels blockading Chesapeake Bay were raiding the American coast by means of boat expeditions. One commander involved in the operations was Captain Charles Stirling of the sloop Savage, armed with sixteen 6-pounders. Stirling was noted for having plundered Mount Vernon, the Virginia estate of General George Washington, who was commander in chief of the Continental Army and later the first American president.

Shortly after the raid of Mount Vernon, Captain Stirling sailed his ship south. In the early morning of September 6, Savage was escorting a convoy when she encountered the sloop-of-war Congress ten leagues from Charleston. Stirling placed Savage between the merchant vessels and the stranger.

Congress was under the command of Captain George Geddes of Philadelphia, armed with twenty 12-pounders and four 6-pounders, with a complement of 215 officers and men. Its Marines were under the command of Captain Allan McLane of the Continental Army. Congress was returning from Cap-François, Haiti, where McLane had carried dispatches from George Washington to Comte François Joseph Paul de Grasse, commander of a French fleet, appealing for his aid at Chesapeake Bay.

When Stirling first saw Congress he sailed towards her, in the hope that she was a privateer of twenty 9-pounder guns that had been raiding in the area. However, when he got closer and saw that she was significantly stronger even than the privateer he thought she might be, Stirling attempted an escape. However, by 10:30 am the Americans came within range and opened fire with their bow chasers. By 11:00 Congress had closed the distance and her crew engaged with muskets and pistols, to which the British replied with "energy". At this point Captain Geddes observed that his ship was faster than that of the enemy so he maneuvered ahead of Savage until almost abreast, in preparation for a broadside.

A duel then commenced at extreme close range, during which both ships were heavily damaged. Sailors on both sides were also burned by the flashes of their enemy's cannon. Congresss rigging was torn to shreds during the exchange, which compelled the Americans to stand off for quick repairs. After doing so, they resumed the chase. Congress was swiftly alongside the Savage again and another duel began.

The Americans and British fought for about an hour, the combat ending with Savage in ruins. Her quarterdeck and forecastle had been completely cleared of resistance, her mizzenmast was blown away, and her mainmast was nearly gone as well. Geddes felt that this was an opportune time to board the enemy, but just as he was moving his ship in, a boatswain appeared on Savages forecastle, waving his hat as a sign of surrender.

British forces lost eight men killed and 34 wounded, including Captain Stirling; the Americans had 11 killed and around 30 wounded. In his letter reporting on the action, Captain Stirling noted that after he and his men became prisoners, the Americans had treated them "with great Humanity."

Aftermath
In America, the capture was widely cheered as payback for the looting of George Washington's home by Captain Stirling and Savages crew.

However, the Americans who boarded Savage never made it back to port. The frigate  recaptured Savage on 12 September, with a prize crew of thirty Americans aboard. Maclay states that the same frigate captured Congress and recaptured Savage. (The London Gazette mentions the recapture of Savage, but not the capture of her captor Congress.)

Notes, citations, and references
Notes

Citations

References

Naval battles of the American Revolutionary War
Naval battles of the American Revolutionary War involving the United States
United States Navy in the 18th century
Naval operations and battles
Conflicts in 1781